{{DISPLAYTITLE:C10H13N5O4}}
The molecular formula C10H13N5O4 (molar mass: 267.24 g/mol) may refer to:

 Adenosine
 Deoxyguanosine
 Vidarabine, or 9-β-D-arabinofuranosyladenine (ara-A)
 Zidovudine